Upjohn was a pharmaceutical firm.

Upjohn, as a surname, is a patronymic name derived from the Welsh "ap Siôn" meaning "son of John". It may refer to:

People
 Gerald Upjohn, Baron Upjohn (1903–1971), a soldier and judge
 Hobart Upjohn (1876–1949), an architect
 Ian Upjohn, barrister
 Richard M. Upjohn (1828–1903), architect
 Richard Upjohn Light (1902–1994), a neurosurgeon, aviator, cinematographer and geographer
 Richard Upjohn (1802–1878), an English-born architect
 William E. Upjohn (1853–1932), a medical doctor
 William George Dismore Upjohn (1888–1979), a surgeon

Fictional characters
 Aubrey Upjohn, fictional character in the Jeeves novels by P. G. Wodehouse
 Bronn (character), in Game of Thrones Season 6 episode 7 ("The Broken Man"), describes himself to Jaime Lannister as "an upjohn sellsword"
 Mrs. Emily Upjohn, a character in the Marx Brothers' film A Day at the Races

Other uses
 Upjohn Co. v. United States, 449 U.S. 383 (1981), a Supreme Court case
 Upjohn dihydroxylation, an organic reaction which converts an alkene to a cis vicinal diol
 Upjohn's Triangle of Health, a short-lived series of animated short films produced in late 1960s and again in late 1970s by The Walt Disney Company's educational media division
 W. E. Upjohn Institute for Employment Research, an American independent research organization based in Kalamazoo, Michigan

Surnames of Welsh origin
Anglicised Welsh-language surnames
Patronymic surnames